This is the filmography of Shankar, the Indian Malayalam actor. He was also a big name of Tamil films in the early 80s. He has acted in over 200 feature films.

Filmography

2010s & 2020s

2000s

1990s

1980s

Television Serials
Ithu Manju Pole 
Swara Raagam (Amrita TV)
Parasparam (Surya TV)
Chithrashalabham (Kairali TV)
Ammakkayi (Surya TV)
Thulabharam (Surya TV)
Ammathottil (Asianet)
Monuttante Onam - telefilm

References

External links
 

Indian filmographies
Male actor filmographies